Cooper Michael Kinney (born January 27, 2003) is an American professional baseball second baseman in the Tampa Bay Rays organization.

Amateur career
Kinney attended Baylor School in Chattanooga, Tennessee, where he played baseball under his father, Mike. In 2019, as a sophomore, he batted .396 with five home runs. As a senior in 2021, he hit .480 with ten home runs and fifty RBIs and was named the Tennessee Gatorade Player of the Year. He committed to play college baseball at the University of South Carolina.

Professional career
Kinney was selected by the Tampa Bay Rays in the first competitive balance round with the 34th overall selection of the 2021 Major League Baseball draft. He signed with the Rays for a $2.1 million signing bonus. He made his professional debut with the Rookie-level Florida Complex League Rays, slashing .286/.468/.371 with five RBIs over 35 at-bats. He missed all of the 2022 season due to undergoing shoulder surgery.

References

External links

2003 births
Living people
People from Kennesaw, Georgia
Sportspeople from Cobb County, Georgia
Baseball players from Tennessee
Baseball second basemen
Florida Complex League Rays players
Baylor School alumni